Alexandre Morisod (born 8 December 1967) is a retired Swiss football midfielder.

References

1967 births
Living people
Swiss men's footballers
Swiss Super League players
Servette FC players
Urania Genève Sport players
Étoile Carouge FC players
Association football midfielders